Both may refer to:

Common English word
 both, a determiner or indefinite pronoun denoting two of something
 both... and, a correlative conjunction

People 
 Both (surname)

Music 
 The Both, an American musical duo consisting of Aimee Mann and Ted Leo; also their self-titled first album
 "Both" (song), by Gucci Mane featuring Drake
 BOTH, Belgian-French musical duo known for the 2014 single "Straight Outta Line"

Film 
 Both (film), a 2005 film about an intersex stunt woman in San Francisco

See also
 Dual number, a form of the plural referring to exactly two things
 2 (number)